Daryl Shuttleworth (born July 22, 1960) is a Canadian actor. He has had numerous small roles in a wide variety of North American television shows and films over the years, but is best known for his role as Detective Sean "Bub" Bailey in the gay-themed Donald Strachey mystery films.

Shuttleworth is the former president of the Canadian Virtual Airlines, a roleplaying simulation about piloting airplanes. He played two different roles in the Stargate SG-1 television series. He has appeared in 6 TV pilots.

Filmography

Film

Television

References

External links 

 

1960 births
Living people
Canadian male film actors
Canadian male television actors